Hotel du Lac is a 1984 novel by Anita Brookner.

Hotel du Lac may also refer to:
Hotel du Lac (film), based on the novel
Hôtel du Lac, Tunis, a hotel in Tunis, Tunisia